The NKK Sea Hawks were a Japanese basketball team that played in the Japan Basketball League. They were based in Kawasaki, Kanagawa Prefecture.

Notable players
Joe Courtney (basketball)
Yutaka Fujimoto
Manabu Fujita
Nobuo Hattori
Kevin Holland (basketball)
Steve Hood
Takashi Itoyama
Dana Jones
Shōji Kamata
Norihiko Kitahara
Kiyohide Kuwata
Eric McArthur
Fumihiko Moroyama
Kazufumi Sakai
Kenji Sōda
Masatomo Taniguchi
Keith Tower
Kaoru Wakabayashi
Kōji Yamamoto

See also
NKK SC, parent club

References

Defunct basketball teams in Japan
Sports teams in Kanagawa Prefecture
Basketball teams established in 1939
Basketball teams disestablished in 1999
1939 establishments in Japan
1999 disestablishments in Japan
Sport in Kawasaki, Kanagawa